Lake Lukomlskoye or Lukoml Lake is a lake in the Chashniki district, Vitsebsk Voblast, of Belarus. It is the fourth largest lake in Belarus. The Lukoml power station is located by it in the city of Novolukoml.

References 

Lakes of Belarus
Chashniki District